Union County is a county located in the north central portion of the U.S. state of Georgia. As of the 2020 census, the population was 24,632. The county seat is Blairsville.

History
Union County was originally a core part of the homeland of the native Cherokee tribe. Mountainous and formerly one of the most remote and inaccessible parts of Georgia, the area became the object of desire for white settlers with the discovery of gold in the 1820s. While the gold rush didn't last long, a land lottery system opened up the area for settlement in the 1830s and Union County was formed in 1832, carved from part of Cherokee County. The newcomers formed political groups to force the Cherokee off their land, part of the removal of most of the southeastern native tribes in what is known as the Trail of Tears.  The part that was Cherokee Removal occurred between 1836 and 1839. The Cherokee nation and roughly 1,600 of their black slaves were forced west to the Indian Territory (present day Oklahoma) in the then Western United States. The resultant deaths along the way and at the end of the movement of an estimated 4,000 Cherokee. The Union Party was a political group that supported removing the Indians and opening the area to white settlers, and is the probable reason for the county's name. The western part of Union County was annexed by Fannin County on 12 January 1854, and in 1856 the southern tip was given to Gilmer County and an eastern section went to Towns County. Many of the early white settlers of the area were Virginians or North Carolianians who came via various frontier roads. As a mountainous region not suited to plantation farming and settled by hardscrabble, independent farmers, Union County had relatively few slaves compared to other areas of Georgia. In the 1850 census, just 61 slave owners were listed, with a total of 278 enslaved people.

The white population of Union County residents were largely pro-Union in the years prior to the Civil War, with sentiments against the plantation-owning aristocratic elites in the lowland sections of the state, as was true of much of Georgia's mountainous north and the Appalachian region in general. When the state seceded and when Lincoln raised a Union army to suppress the rebellion, most Union County residents supported the Confederacy and most of the soldiers from the county fought on the Confederate side either as enlistees or, after the Confederate draft of 1862, as draftees. Joseph E. Brown, the wartime governor of Georgia, was a resident of Union County, having moved there from western South Carolina. Brown was an ardent secessionist and a defender of slavery, but was a controversial southern governor, a north Georgian never fully accepted by the plantation class but still popular with the common white Georgians, whom he championed. Brown vehemently opposed the Confederate draft and was a constant thorn in the side of the central Confederate government which he saw as usurping increasing power from the states. Despite general support for the Confederacy, a smaller number of Union sympathizers remained in Union County, which was one of the few Georgia counties to provide men for a Union Army unit, company A of the 1st Georgia Infantry Battalion, in which 6 men were killed.

After the war, railroad lines were built that linked Union County to other areas, including Gainesville and Culberson, North Carolina, giving farmers expanded distribution. The first paved road in Union County was completed in 1926 and ran from Cleveland to the North Carolina border. Tourism increased when the federal government acquired 31,000 acres of forest in the area, spread across Fannin, Gilmer, Lumpkin, and Union counties, and created the Chattahoochee National Forest in 1937.

Geography
Brasstown Bald, the highest mountain in Georgia, rises in southeast Union County, straddling the Towns County line. The central and northern portion of Union County is located in the Hiwassee River sub-basin of the Middle Tennessee-Hiwassee basin, while the southwestern portion of the county is located in the Ocoee River sub-basin of the same larger watershed. A very small portion of the county's southeastern corner is located in the Upper Chattahoochee River sub-basin of the ACF River Basin (Apalachicola-Chattahoochee-Flint River Basin, also listed as simply the Apalachicola Basin by USGS). This is also where the source of the Chattahoochee is found.

Adjacent counties
 Cherokee County, North Carolina (north)
 Clay County, North Carolina (northeast)
 Towns County (east)
 White County (southeast)
 Lumpkin County (south)
 Fannin County (west)

National protected area
 Chattahoochee National Forest (part)

Transportation

Major highways

  U.S. Route 19
  U.S. Route 76
  U.S. Route 129
  State Route 2
  State Route 11
  State Route 60
  State Route 180
  State Route 325
  State Route 348
  State Route 515

Other roads

 Blue Ridge Highway (Old US 76/Old SR 2)
 Skeenah Gap Road
 Town Creek School Road
 Mulky Gap Road
 Owltown Road
 Spiva Bridge Way
 Gumlog Road
 Loving Road
 Nottely Dam Road (Old SR 325). Not all of Nottely Dam Road remains a state route.
 Pat Haralson Memorial Drive
 Trackrock Gap Road

Demographics

2000 census
As of the census of 2000, there were 17,289 people, 7,159 households, and 5,211 families living in the county.  The population density was 54 people per square mile (21/km2).  There were 10,001 housing units at an average density of 31 per square mile (12/km2).  The racial makeup of the county was 97.94% White, 0.58% Black or African American, 0.25% Native American, 0.23% Asian, 0.02% Pacific Islander, 0.24% from other races, and 0.74% from two or more races.  0.88% of the population were Hispanic or Latino of any race. Union County was mentioned as an "Extreme Whitopia", a place with a high concentration of white residents, in Rich Benjamin's book, Searching for Whitopia. (Because American Indians were forced out, and black slavery was virtually nonexistent in this part of the Georgia mountains, the county has had a minuscule nonwhite population for almost 200 years.)

There were 7,159 households, out of which 24.80% had children under the age of 18 living with them, 62.90% were married couples living together, 7.10% had a female householder with no husband present, and 27.20% were non-families. 24.20% of all households were made up of individuals, and 12.00% had someone living alone who was 65 years of age or older.  The average household size was 2.35 and the average family size was 2.77.

In the county, the population was spread out, with 20.00% under the age of 18, 6.60% from 18 to 24, 23.60% from 25 to 44, 28.20% from 45 to 64, and 21.60% who were 65 years of age or older.  The median age was 45 years. For every 100 females there were 96.60 males.  For every 100 females age 18 and over, there were 94.60 males.

The median income for a household in the county was $31,893, and the median income for a family was $39,776. Males had a median income of $29,127 versus $20,871 for females. The per capita income for the county was $18,845.  About 9.30% of families and 12.50% of the population were below the poverty line, including 13.10% of those under age 18 and 15.90% of those age 65 or over.

2010 census
As of the 2010 United States Census, there were 21,356 people, 9,116 households, and 6,382 families living in the county. The racial makeup of the county was 96.8% white, 0.5% black or African American, 0.4% Asian, 0.3% American Indian, 0.9% from other races, and 1.2% from two or more races. Those of Hispanic or Latino origin made up 2.4% of the population. In terms of ancestry, 16.0% were English, 15.8% were Irish, 15.0% were "American", and 13.2% were German.

Of the 9,116 households, 22.6% had children under the age of 18 living with them, 58.8% were married couples living together, 8.0% had a female householder with no husband present, 30.0% were non-families, and 26.2% of all households were made up of individuals. The average household size was 2.30 and the average family size was 2.75. The median age was 50.7 years.

The median income for a household in the county was $41,298 and the median income for a family was $50,772. Males had a median income of $42,330 versus $29,176 for females. The per capita income for the county was $24,182. About 9.5% of families and 13.9% of the population were below the poverty line, including 14.5% of those under age 18 and 9.5% of those age 65 or over.

2020 census

As of the 2020 United States census, there were 24,632 people, 9,743 households, and 6,957 families residing in the county.

Communities

City
 Blairsville

Unincorporated communities
 Choestoe
 Ivy Log
 Suches

Government and Politics
The county's Sole commissioner is Lamar Paris, who has served since 2001.

See also

 National Register of Historic Places listings in Union County, Georgia
List of counties in Georgia

References

External links
  Union County Government Website
  City of Blairsville Government Website
  Blairsville and Union County Website
  Blairsville-Union County Chamber of Commerce
 Documents from Union County in the Digital Library of Georgia
 North Georgia News (county legal organ) Website

 
Georgia (U.S. state) counties
1832 establishments in Georgia (U.S. state)
Populated places established in 1832
Northeast Georgia
Counties of Appalachia